Meridian is a census-designated place (CDP) in Butler County, Pennsylvania, United States. The population was 3,881 at the 2010 census.

History
Meridian was linked to Butler, Evans City and Pittsburgh in 1908 by the Pittsburgh, Harmony, Butler and New Castle Railway, an interurban trolley line. The line closed on 15 June 1931, and the trolleys were replaced by buses.

Geography
Meridian is located in the western part of Butler Township at  (40.854415, -79.956359). It is bordered to the east and partly to the north by the Homeacre-Lyndora CDP. Pennsylvania Route 68 forms the northern edge of the Meridian CDP, leading east  to downtown Butler and southwest  to Evans City.

Demographics

As of the census of 2000, there were 3,794 people, 1,489 households, and 1,137 families living in the CDP. The population density was 1,337.7 people per square mile (515.8/km2). There were 1,524 housing units at an average density of 537.3/sq mi (207.2/km2). The racial makeup of the CDP was 99.24% White, 0.18% African American, 0.08% Native American, 0.29% Asian, 0.08% Pacific Islander, and 0.13% from two or more races. Hispanic or Latino of any race were 0.37% of the population.

There were 1,489 households, out of which 28.0% had children under the age of 18 living with them, 67.7% were married couples living together, 6.2% had a female householder with no husband present, and 23.6% were non-families. 21.1% of all households were made up of individuals, and 11.5% had someone living alone who was 65 years of age or older. The average household size was 2.52 and the average family size was 2.93.

In the CDP the population was spread out, with 21.3% under the age of 18, 5.5% from 18 to 24, 25.1% from 25 to 44, 29.9% from 45 to 64, and 18.2% who were 65 years of age or older. The median age was 44 years. For every 100 females there were 96.9 males. For every 100 females age 18 and over, there were 93.8 males.

The median income for a household in the CDP was $48,939, and the median income for a family was $57,893. Males had a median income of $44,458 versus $27,933 for females. The per capita income for the CDP was $22,962. About 3.9% of families and 6.3% of the population were below the poverty line, including 2.3% of those under age 18 and 13.8% of those age 65 or over.

References

Census-designated places in Butler County, Pennsylvania